Udaipur city, also known as the 'City of Lakes' and 'Venice of East', is a very popular tourist destination in Rajasthan, India. The capital of the former princely state of Mewar, and considered as one amongst the most romantic cities of India, Udaipur is a land around the azure water lakes, hemmed in by the lush hills of the Aravalis. The city is a blend of sights, sounds and experiences. With its kaleidoscope of fairy-tale palaces, lakes, temples, gardens and narrow lanes, the city carries the flavor of heroic past, epitomizing valor and chivalry. 
Voted the Best City in the World in 2009 by Travel + Leisure magazine, Udaipur is now amongst the favourite wedding destinations for Indian as well as foreign nationals.

Some of the key tourist destinations are:

Ahar Cenotaphs 

The Ahar Cenotaphs are a group of royal cenotaphs of the Maharanas of Mewar, located about 2 km east of Udaipur. It has about nineteen cenotaphs of various Maharanas cremated, including one of Maharana Amar Singh, who reigned from 1597 to 1620. Nearby is also Ahar Museum, where on display is limited but very rare earthen pottery, as well as some sculptures and other archaeological finds. Some pieces date back to 1700 BC, and a tenth-century metal figure of Buddha is a special attraction.

Badi Lake
Badi Lake is an artificial freshwater lake built in the village of Badi, about 12  km from the city of Udaipur. Built by Maharana Raj Singh I (1652–1680), it was aimed to counteract the devastating effects of a famine. This lake covers an area of 155 km2., and is graced by three artistic chhatris (kiosks or pavilions). Devoid of any commercial activity, the Badi Lake gives a view of a never-ending expanse providing a serene and calm atmosphere to the visitors.

City Palace 

City Palace, a 400-year-old palace, is located on the east bank of the Lake Pichola. It comprises a series of vilas, halls, gateways, courtyards, overlapping parations, terraces, corridors and gardens. Monuments like the Lake Palace, Jag Mandir, Jagdish Temple, Monsoon Palace, and Neemach Mata temple, are all in the vicinity of the palace complex. City palace was also used for shooting of movies like Octopussy and Goliyon Ki Raasleela Ram-Leela. A 1991 documentary film called Jag Mandir consists of footage of an elaborate theatrical performance for the Maharana Arvind Singh Mewar at the City Palace staged by André Heller.

Bharatiya Lok Kala Mandal 
Bharatiya Lok Kala Mandal, a cultural institution, is engaged in studying folk art, culture, songs and festivals of various regions of India, including Rajasthan, Gujarat and Madhya Pradesh. It also aims at popularizing and propagating folk arts, folk dances and folk literature.

Jag Mandir

Jag Mandir palace is built on an island in Lake Pichola and is known for its beautiful interiors and grand style of architecture. It is also known as the "Lake Garden Palace". This palace is now the Jagmandir Island Palace, a heritage hotel.

Bagore ki Haveli  
This is an old building built right on the waterfront of Lake Pichola at Gangor Ghat. The haveli now stages Rajasthani traditional dance and music.

Doodh Talai Lake
Doodh Talai Lake, a small pond located adjacent to the Lake Pichola, is surrounded by small hillocks which hosts Deen Dayal Upadhyay Park, and Manikya Lal Verma Garden (or Rock Garden or Musical Fountain Garden). It provides few options for fast food centers, camel and horse rides and boat ride.

Jagdish Temple

Jagdish Temple is a splendid example of either Māha Māru or the Māru-Gurjara architecture decorated by beautiful and ornate carvings. A short walk from the city palace will bring you to this temple. The temple sanctum has an idol of the deity Lord Jagannath.

Deen Dayal Upadhyay Park
This is a garden developed around the Dudh Talai by Urban Improvement Trust (UIT) Udaipur, the local development authority. Visitors may enjoy watching a musical fountain here. A ropeway has been set up here to reach Karni Mata Temple at the top of Machhla Mangra.

Fateh Sagar Lake
Fateh Sagar Lake is an artificial lake situated to the north of the Lake Pichola, in the north-west of Udaipur city, around 6 km from Udaipur City Railway Station. It was named after Maharana Fateh Singh of Udaipur and Mewar.

Lake Palace

Lake Palace (formerly known as Jag Niwas) is a luxury hotel, which has 83 rooms and suites featuring white marble walls. The Lake Palace is located on the island of Jag Niwas in Lake Pichola, Udaipur, India, and its natural foundation spans 4 acres (16,000 m2). Built between 1743 and 1746 under the direction of the Maharana Jagat Singh II (62nd successor to the royal dynasty of Mewar) of Udaipur, the private summer resort of the erstwhile royal family has been turned into a luxury hotel. The hotel has been ranked as amongst the best luxury heritage hotels in the country.

Gulab Bagh and Zoo
A rose garden laid out by Maharaja Sajjan Singh of Udaipur is situated near the palace on the east side of Lake Pichhola. A library in the garden has a collection of ancient handwritten manuscripts and books. Some of the part of the Satyarth Prakash have been written in this library. Styarth Prakash stup is situated in Gulab Bagh. Within the garden, there is a zoo which used to have tigers, leopards, Chinkara gazelle, birds, and many wild animals, but now most of these animals have been moved to Sajjangarh Biological Park. Children can still enjoy a mini train, the track of which covers the main part of the garden and the zoo.

Pichola Lake
Lake Pichola, an artificial fresh water lake created in the year 1362 AD, is one of several contiguous lakes in the city.
The lake was built by Banjara, a gypsy "Banjara" tribesman who transported grain, during the reign of Maharana Lakha. Later, Maharana Udai Singh, impressed by the charm of this lake with the backdrop of green hills, founded the city of Udaipur on the banks of the lake and also enlarged the Lake by constructing a stone masonry dam in the Badipol region on the shore of the lake.

There are four islands on the lake:
 Jag Niwas, where is built the Lake Palace
 Jag Mandir, with the palace of the same name
 Mohan Mandir, from where the king would watch the annual Gangaur festival celebration 
 Arsi Vilas, a small island which was an ammunition depot, and also a small palace

Monsoon Palace

Monsoon Palace was built in 1884 by Maharana Sajjan Singh of the Mewar Dynasty giving it the name Sajjangarh. The palace is near Fateh Sagar Lake. The palace was also used in the 1983 James Bond film Octopussy

Moti Magri
Atop the Moti Magri or Pearl Hill, overlooking the Fatah Sagar Lake is the memorial of the Rajput hero Maharana Pratap with a bronze statue of the Maharana astride his favourite horse, "Chetak".

Sajjangarh Biological Park
Sajjangarh Biological Park, a zoological garden, is situated just beneath the Monsoon Palace (also known as Sajjajgarh Garh Palace), around 4 km from the city center. The zoo houses vast varieties of animals and birds brought in from different parts of the world. At present, it has more than 60 animals of 21 species including tigers, panthers, lions, ostriches, alligators, and rhesus monkeys. Within two months of its inauguration, the park received more than 46,000 visitors in a month, generating a revenue of Rs 14 lakh for the forest department, which is a record in itself.

Saheliyon ki Bari

Saheliyon-ki-Bari or 'Courtyard of the Maidens' is a garden and a popular tourist destination. With fountains, kiosks, a lotus pool and marble elephants, this garden was built from 1710 to 1734 by Maharana Sangram Singh for the royal ladies. This renowned garden is located on the banks of Fateh Sagar Lake and also has a small museum with the  collection of royal households.

Shilpgram

Shilpgram is a rural arts and crafts complex, situated 3 km west of the city of Udaipur. The center is spread over an undulating terrain of about 70 acres, surrounded by the Aravali mountains. The complex was established with a purpose to depict the lifestyles of the folk and tribal people of the region. With an objective of increasing awareness and knowledge about the rural arts and crafts, the Shilpgram provides opportunity to rural and urban artists to come together and interact through camps and workshops.

Purohito Ka Talab 
Purohito ka Talab is located at a distance of around 12 kilometres from Udaipur city. The Lake is surrounded by green mountains. Purohito ka Taalab is also called as ‘Mini Jaisamand’. It's situated between the Aravalli Range.

Places nearby

Nathdwara – Shri Nathdwara (a pathway to Lord Shri Krishna) lies 48 km from Udaipur and literally means "the gateway to the Lord". Devotees throng the shrine in large numbers during occasions of "Janmashtmi", the day of the Lord's birth, and other festivals like Holi. It is famous for Shrinathji Temple and its pichwai paintings, with Shri Krishna in the centre, and is recognized for profuse use of gold colour.
Ranakpur – a village that is home to one of the most important Jain temples. 1400+ marble pillars support the temple. Opposite the Jain temple is the much older Sun Temple. It is located in Pali District, 110 km north of Udaipur.
Chittorgarh – About 112 km from Udaipur, Chittorgarh was the capital of Mewar from 734 AD to 1559. Chittor Fort is a massive fort situated on a hilltop near Chittorgarh town in Rajasthan state in India.
Haldighati – a mountain pass in Rajsamand District that hosted the battle between Rana Pratap Singh of Mewar and the Mughal emperor Akbarl; it is now a memorial site.
Kumbhalgarh – a 15th-century fortress, built by Rana Kumbha of Mewar, with 36 kilometres of walls. Over 360 temples are within the fort. It also has a wildlife sanctuary. It is located in Rajsamand District, 90 km from Udaipur. The vista from the top of the palace typically extends tens of kilometers into the Aravalli hills.
 Aayadh Jain tirth 
Mount Abu – a popular tourist hill station. Dilwara Temples are the chief attraction of this place.
Eklingji – a temple complex situated nearly 22 km in the north of Udaipur. It was built in 734 A.D. and consists of 108 temples chiseled out of sandstone and marbles; it is devoted to the royal family of Mewar.
Kumbhalgarh Wildlife Sanctuary – located in the most rugged of the Aravali in Pali, Rajsamand and Udaipur districts of Rajasthan. It takes its name after the historic fort of Kumbhalgarh, which comes into view over the park. It is 578 km² in area and at an altitude of 500 to 1,300 metres. It is home to a large variety of wildlife, some of which are highly endangered species. The wildlife includes wolf, leopards, sloth bear, hyena, jackal, jungle cat, smabhar, nilgai, chaisingh (the four horned antelope), chinkara, and hare.
Kankroli and Rajsamand Lake – Dwarakadish Temple, Nau Choukiya, JK Tyre factory
Adinda Parshwnath – a famous Jain temple of "Parshwnath ji", 42 kilometres from Udaipur. It was the only south-faced Jain temple in India.
Rishabhdeo – also known as "Kesariya ji" or "Kala Baoji", it is a famous Jain pilgrimage center sacred to Jains and local tribals; its local name is Dhulev.
Jagat – known as Khajuraho of Rajasthan, it is famous for the Jagadambeshwari Durga temple.
Bambora – a fort and Idana mata temple nearby.
Jaisamand Lake – the second biggest man-made lake in Asia. The picturesque and beautiful lake has many inhabitable islands.
Udaisagar Lake – one of the five prominent lakes of Udaipur, built by Maharana Udai Singh in 1565.
 Sita Mata Wildlife Sanctuary – It is said that Sita spent her exile period here in Guru Valmiki ashram. Here are many places related to Sita and Luv-Kush. Sita also go into mother Earth's lap here it is near Bansi, Barisadri and Dhariyawad, famous for flying squirrel, teak forest, tiger and very big fair of Sitamata is also organized every year in May. Jakham dam is also inside this sanctuary.
 Baneshwar – 120 km from Udaipur on Banswara road near Sabla, Jakham, Som and Mahi river are merged here, every year Kumbh for Aadiwasi's in January month organised.
Galiakot – Mazar-e-Seyadi Fakhruddun Shaheed
Dungarpur – Gap sagar, city palace
Banswara – Mahi dam and Tripura Sundari temple
Chavand – the third capital of Mewar and also the place where Great Maharana Pratap spent his last 21 years.
 Bhinder – fort, pond, temples, Drgah Sultan-ji-Shahhed.
 Kanor – Adeshware Ji is an ancient Jain Temple near Kanore, about 3 km
Bandoli – near Chawand, Maharana Pratap's canopy is situated here.
Mayaro ki Gufa – Rana Pratap used to keep his arms and ammunitions here.
Molela – a village near Haldi Ghati famous for its red pottery "terra cotta".
Kamal Nath – near Jhadol, it is said that Ravana the demon king of Lanka worshiped here of Lord Shiva and offer his head instead of lotus flower to God. Rana Pratap also stayed here for some time after Haldighati war.
 Matrikundia – it is known as Prayag of Mewar, holi place near Rashmi on Banas river bank.
Sanwaliaji Temple – 70 km east from Udaipur famous krishna temple.
 Avari Mata temple – 80 km in east from Udaipur
 Jhakham Dam – in Sita mata century
 Salumber – fort, pond, temples, famous for Hadi Rani's sacrifice.
 Charbhuja ji – at Gadbor village in Rajsamand district, one of the char-dham of Mewar, 90 km in north from Udaipur.
 Sardar garh – fort and lotus (Kamal) shaped Alakh mandir (self-realization place of Mahatma Bhuri Bai)
 Laksmanpura – famous for Ram Jharokha, village of notable saint Sri Guman Singh ji, 25 km east from Udaipur
 Nauwa – near Khemli 20 km from udaipur, self -realization place for yogivirya Baoji Chatur Singh ji Mewar.
 Bemla – famous for Kurabadia Bheruji, beautiful land-scape, Bemleshwar mahadev, dhuni.
 Tidi Dam – 40 km in south of Udaipur near Zawar mines
 Som Kagdar Dam – 65 km in the south of Udaipur and near Kherwara
 Som-Kamala-Amba Dam – near Aaspur
 Nandeshwar ji – 11 km south-west from Udaipur on Jhadol road.
 Ubeshwar ji – 19 km west from Udaipur
 Mansi Wakal dam – 60 km from Udaipur
 Keleshwar Mahadeo – 29 km west of Udaipur
 Gupteshwar Mahadeo – Shiva temple situated at top of hillock, in Titaradi area, around 20 km from city center.
 Jhameshwar Mahadeo – 22 km in south of Udaipur, mahadeo temple, Ambika mata temple, waterfall and picnic spot
 Baghdada – crocodile park and habitat center, 12 km south of Udaipur
 Statue of Shiva – situated at the beautiful village of Menar between Udaipur and Chittor, 45 km east of Udaipur.  This statue is on the bank of Bhram Sagar.

References

Top attractions around Udaipur

Udaipur-related lists
 
U
U